Dudusa nobilis is a moth of the family Notodontidae first described by Francis Walker in 1865. It is found in northern and south-eastern China and Taiwan.

The larvae feed on the leaves of Litchi chinensis and Nephelium lappaceum.

Subspecies
Dudusa nobilis nobilis
Dudusa nobilis baibarana (Matsumura, 1929) (Taiwan)

References

Moths described in 1865
Notodontidae